The 2010 Canadian Senior Curling Championships were held March 20-28 at the Ottawa Hunt and Golf Club in Ottawa, Ontario. The winning teams represented Canada at the 2011 World Senior Curling Championships, and swept the event with double gold medals.

Men's

Teams

Standings

Results

Draw 2

Draw 4

Draw 5

Draw 6

Draw 7

Draw 8

Draw 9

Draw 10

Draw 11

Draw 12

Draw 13

Draw 14

Draw 16

Draw 18

Draw 20

Draw 22

Playoffs

Semifinal

Final

Women's teams

Standings

Results

Draw 1

Draw 3

Draw 5

Draw 6

Draw 7

Draw 8

Draw 9

Draw 10

Draw 11

Draw 12

Draw 13

Draw 14

Draw 15

Draw 17

Draw 19

Draw 21

Playoffs

Tiebreaker

Semifinal

Final

External links
Official site 

2010
Senior Curling Championships
Canadian Senior Curling Championships, 2010
2010s in Ottawa
2010 in Ontario
March 2010 sports events in Canada